20th Anniversary Tour may refer to:

20th Anniversary Tour (Blink-182)
20th Anniversary Tour (Candlebox)
20th Anniversary Tour 1986 (The Monkees)